The fourth cholera pandemic of the 19th century began in the Ganges Delta of the Bengal region and traveled with Muslim pilgrims to Mecca. In its first year, the epidemic claimed 30,000 of 90,000 pilgrims. Cholera spread throughout the Middle East and was carried to the Russian Empire, Europe, Africa, and North America, in each case spreading via travelers from port cities and along inland waterways.

The pandemic reached Northern Africa in 1865 and spread to sub-Saharan Africa, killing 70,000 in Zanzibar in 1869–70. Cholera claimed 90,000 lives in Russia in 1866. The epidemic of cholera that spread with the Austro-Prussian War (1866) is estimated to have taken 165,000 lives in the Austrian Empire, including 30,000 each in Hungary and Belgium, and 20,000 in the Netherlands.

In June 1866, a localized epidemic in the East End of London claimed 5,596 lives, just as the city was completing construction of its major sewage and water treatment systems; the East End section was not quite complete. It was also caused by the city's overcrowding in the East End, which helped the disease to spread more quickly in the area. Epidemiologist William Farr identified the East London Water Company as the source of the contamination. Farr made use of prior work by John Snow and others, pointing to contaminated drinking water as the likely cause of cholera in an 1854 outbreak. In the same year, the use of contaminated canal water in local water works caused a minor outbreak at Ystalyfera in South Wales. Workers associated with the company, and their families, were most affected, and 119 died.

In 1867, Italy lost 113,000 to cholera, and 80,000 died of the disease in Algeria. Outbreaks in North America in the 1870s killed some 50,000 Americans as cholera spread from New Orleans via passengers along the Mississippi River and to ports on its tributaries.

See also
 Cholera outbreaks and pandemics

References

External links
  Book on Pandemics

Cholera pandemics
19th-century epidemics
Epidemics in India
1860s in India
1870s in India
1860s disease outbreaks
1870s disease outbreaks
Incidents during the Hajj